The Paracas Peninsula is a desert peninsula within the boundaries of the Paracas National Reserve, a marine reserve that extends south along the coast of Peru.  The only marine reserve in the country, it is a designated UNESCO World Heritage Site. This is to mark and preserve the archeological sites of the Paracas culture, in addition to the marine habitat.  

The peninsula is located within the Paracas District of Pisco Province in the Ica Region, on the south coast of Peru. Pottery nearby was dated to 200 BCE, placing it within the Paracas culture. Its origins and purpose have inspired many theories.

A shipping port was built along the northern peninsula, where deeper water permits larger transport and cruise ships to anchor. Tourists can have access to the Paracas National Reserve, a large marine reserve, while the ships are protected against ocean waves and currents. The peninsula includes red sand beaches formed from sands eroded from nearby cliffs.

The port is reached by a single road from the mainland, and passes through the Paracas National Reserve.  The Centre Museum, also called the Paracas Museum, holds several ancient artifacts from the Paracas culture.  It also provides detailed information and interpretation about the flora and fauna native to the Reservation, including the many varieties of birds of Paracas.

References

External links 
Visita e imágenes de la península de Paracas y las islas Ballestas ESP

Peninsulas of Peru
Landforms of Ica Region